The USM Alger Centre d'entraînement et de formation is the training ground and academy base of Algerian football club USM Alger. The club is located in Ain Benian in the western suburbs of Algiers.

Construction
Its official opening is scheduled for 2022. In July 2011, the club began training center construction. Progress was halted in 2015 due to the priority of improvised housing. The project's lead architect based the design on the plans created by Joan Gamper for FC Barcelona's training center. On October 13, 2018, the first foundation stone was laid and the start of construction was announced in a ceremony organized by the management of USM Alger; the Algerian Minister of Youth and Sport, Mohamed Hattab; and the Wali of Algiers, Abdelkader Zoukh.

The professional training center of USMA covers over 3 hectares. The site offers two football pitches: one with synthetic turf from the last generation and the other with a natural hybrid grass, which is optimal for intensive use. The center will house administrative, educational and catering facilities, as well as accommodations, an official club shop, and relaxation areas. On July 6, 2020, USM Alger singe a two-year contract with Aïn Benian Hotel and Catering School until the completion of the work of the training center, The contract will allow USM Alger to use the stadium, the swimming pool, the weight room, the hotel, the sports hall, the offices and the recovery and massage room.

On March 15, 2021, the construction works of USM Alger's training center were officially launched, central technical director and production Rachid Douh stated that the plot contains 30,000 square meters, and will house the club's headquarters two playgrounds inside the hall two changing rooms and two playgrounds with artificial grass. The works will be carried out by EPE Batimetal. In January 2023, the company in charge of the completion announced the end of the first part of the works, which is the structure of the main building that will be the club's headquarters, and it is the largest in the project.

Handover and opening

Facilities 
 Pitch 1: (105 x 68 metres)
 Pitch 2: 
 Pitch 3: 
 Pitch 4: 
 Pitch 5:

References

USM Alger
Sports venues in Algiers